Live Like You Were Dying is the eighth studio album by American country music artist Tim McGraw. It was released on August 24, 2004, by Curb Records and was recorded in a mountaintop studio in upstate New York. It entered the Billboard 200 chart at number one, with sales of 766,000 copies in its first week. The album was certified 4 x Platinum by the RIAA for shipping four million copies, and was nominated for two Grammies in 2005 for Best Country Vocal Performance Male and Best Country Album, winning for Best Country Vocal Performance. Five singles were released from the album, all were top 15 hits on the Hot Country Songs chart, two of which hit #1.

Content 
The title track was the first single from the album. The song peaked at number 1 on the Billboard Hot Country Songs chart, held it for seven weeks, and peaked at number 29 on the Billboard Hot 100. The song won a Grammy Award for Best Male Country Vocal Performance. The music video for the title track prominently featured McGraw's father, former baseball player Tug McGraw, who had died of brain cancer. This song was also the number one country song of 2004 according to Billboard Year-End.

The next single from this album is "Back When", which also reached #1 on Billboard Hot Country Songs chart. The third single, "Drugs or Jesus" peaked at #14, making it the first McGraw single since 1993 not to reach the country Top 10 (not counting "Tiny Dancer"). "Do You Want Fries with That" was the fourth single and peaked at #5, and the fifth and final single, "My Old Friend", peaked at #6.

"How Bad Do You Want It" was featured as the theme song to CMT's Trick My Truck. "Can't Tell Me Nothin'" was previously recorded by Travis Tritt on his 2002 album Strong Enough.

Track listing

Personnel 

Tim McGraw & The Dance Hall Doctors
 Tim McGraw – lead vocals
 Jeff McMahon – acoustic piano, Rhodes, Wurlitzer electric piano, Hammond B3 organ, synthesizers 
 Denny Hemingson – electric guitar, steel guitar, baritone guitar, slide guitar, dobro, Melobar guitar
 Bob Minner – acoustic guitar, banjo, mandolin (2, 12)
 Darran Smith – electric guitar, acoustic guitar (12)
 Deano Brown – fiddle, mandolin
 John Marcus – bass 
 Billy Mason – drums
 David Dunkley – percussion

Background vocals
 Russell Terrell (1, 3, 4, 8, 14)
 Steve McEwan (2)
 Greg Barnhill (4-7, 11, 16)
 Kim Carnes (4, 6)
 Bob Bailey (6)
 Kim Fleming (6)
 Vicki Hampton  (6)
 Rodney Crowell (9)
 Wes Hightower (10, 15, 16)
 Faith Hill (12)
 Brett Warren (12)
 Gene Miller (13, 16)
 Chris Rodriguez (13)

Strings on tracks 5, 6, 11 & 15
 David Campbell – string arrangements
 Suzie Katayama – string contractor
 Larry Corbett and Suzie Katayama – cello
 Bob Becker and  Evan Wilson  – viola
 Charlie Bisharat, Darius Campo, Susan Chatman, Mario DeLeon, Berj Garabedian, Armen Garabedian, Natalie Leggett and Sara Parkins – violin

Production 
 Byron Gallimore – producer, mixing 
 Tim McGraw – producer, mixing 
 Darran Smith – producer
 Missi Gallimore – A&R direction
 Julian King – tracking engineer (1, 3-13, 15)
 David Bryant – second tracking engineer (1, 3-13, 15)
 Steve Churchyard – string engineer (5, 6, 11, 15)
 Greg Lawrence – additional engineer (5, 6, 11, 15), second string engineer (5, 6, 11, 15)
 Jesse Chrisman – assistant engineer 
 Ricky Cobble – assistant engineer (1, 3-13, 15)
 Matt Cullen – assistant engineer 
 Jason Gantt – assistant engineer, Pro Tools engineer
 Erik Lutkins – assistant engineer, Pro Tools engineer
 Sara Lesher – assistant engineer 
 Harry McCarthy – technician assistant 
 John Prestia – technician assistant 
 Mike Rector – technician assistant 
 Hank Williams – mastering 
 Ann Callis – production assistant 
 Kelly Clauge Wright – creative director 
 Glenn Sweitzer – art direction, design 
 Mark Seliger – cover photography 
 Tony Duran – back photography

Studios
 Tracks 1, 3-13 & 15 recorded at Allaire Studios (Shokan, New York).
 Tracks 2, 4, 14 & 16 recorded at Blackbird Studio (Nashville, Tennessee).
 Strings recorded at Record One Studio B (Sherman Oaks, California).
 Mixed at Essential Sound (Houston, Texas) and Emerald Sound Studio (Nashville, Tennessee).
 Mastered at MasterMix (Nashville, Tennessee).

Chart positions
Live Like You Were Dying debuted on the US Billboard 200 chart at number one, his third number-one album, and on the Top Country Albums at number one, making it his seventh number one on that chart.

Weekly charts

Year-end charts

Sales and certifications

References

External links
 

2004 albums
Tim McGraw albums
Curb Records albums
Albums produced by Byron Gallimore
Albums with cover art by Tony Duran
Albums produced by Tim McGraw